Amanitin may refer to several related amatoxins:

 α-Amanitin
 β-Amanitin
 γ-Amanitin
 ε-Amanitin

See also
 Amatoxin, a class of toxic compounds that include the amanitins
 Amanin, another amatoxin